Puhosjärvi is a medium-sized lake in the Iijoki main catchment area. It is located in Pudasjärvi municipality, in the region of Northern Ostrobothnia in Finland.

See also
List of lakes in Finland

References

Lakes of Pudasjärvi